Cornelius Conway Felton (November 6, 1807 – February 26, 1862) was an American educator. He was regent of the Smithsonian Institution, as well as professor of Greek literature and president of Harvard University.

Early life
Felton was born in West Newbury, Massachusetts. He graduated from Harvard University in 1827, having taught school in the winter vacations of his sophomore and junior years. During his undergraduate years, he was also a member of the Hasty Pudding.

Career
After teaching in the Livingstone High School of Geneseo, New York, for two years, he became tutor at Harvard in 1829, university professor of Greek in 1832, and Eliot Professor of Greek Literature in 1834. In 1860 he succeeded James Walker as president of Harvard, which position he held until his death.

He was elected a member of the American Antiquarian Society in 1854.

Felton edited many classical texts. His annotations on Wolf's text of the Iliad (1833) are especially valuable. Greece, Ancient and Modern (2 vols., 1867), forty-nine lectures before the Lowell Institute, is scholarly, able and suggestive of the author's personality.

Among his miscellaneous publications are the American edition of Sir William Smith's History of Greece (1855); translations of Menzel's German Literature (1840), of Munk's Metres of the Greeks and Romans (1844), and of Guyot's Earth and Man (1849); and Familiar Letters from Europe (1865).

Personal life

Felton was the brother of Samuel Morse Felton, Sr., the half-brother of John B. Felton  and the uncle of Samuel Morse Felton, Jr.

Death
He died of "disease of the heart" while en route to a Smithsonian meeting in Washington. He died at the home of his brother in Chester, Pennsylvania.

Legacy
A historical marker in the town of West Newbury marks Felton's birthplace.

References

Publications
 Proceedings of the Massachusetts Historical Society (Boston, 1866)

External links

 
 Biography, part of a series of Harvard's Unitarian Presidents

1807 births
1862 deaths
Presidents of Harvard University
People from Saugus, Massachusetts
People from West Newbury, Massachusetts
Harvard University faculty
Members of the American Antiquarian Society
Hasty Pudding alumni